George Simmonds (16 July 1895 – 15 January 1973) was an Australian rules footballer who played with Melbourne in the Victorian Football League (VFL). He later played country football for South Ballarat and Murtoa.

Notes

External links 

Demonwiki profile

1895 births
Australian rules footballers from Victoria (Australia)
Melbourne Football Club players
1973 deaths
Murtoa Football Club players
South Ballarat Football Club players
Indigenous Australian players of Australian rules football